Álvaro Desiderio García Hurtado (born 22 March 1954) is a Chilean politician who served as minister.

References

Living people
1954 births

21st-century Chilean politicians
Saint George's College, Santiago alumni
Pontifical Catholic University of Chile alumni
University System of Maryland alumni
University of California, Berkeley alumni
Popular Unitary Action Movement politicians
Party for Democracy (Chile) politicians
Politicians from Santiago